The simple-station Paloquemao is part of the TransMilenio mass-transit system of Bogotá, Colombia, opened in the year 2000.

Location
The station is located in the western part of downtown Bogotá, specifically on the Avenida NQS with Calle 19.

History
This station opened in 2005 as part of the second line of phase two of TransMilenio construction, opening service to Avenida NQS. The station serves the demand of the Paloquemao area, the industrial zone of Puente Aranda, and surrounding neighborhoods.

Station services

Old trunk services

Main line service

Feeder routes
This station does not have connections to feeder routes.

Inter-city service
This station does not have inter-city service.

See also
Bogotá
TransMilenio
List of TransMilenio Stations

TransMilenio